Dunphail railway station was opened with the Inverness and Perth Junction Railway in 1863.

Station layout 
The station layout was double platform (including passing loop) with a goods siding and loading platform. The station was controlled by a signal box at the north end. There was a standard Highland Railway overbridge connecting the platforms, also at the north end of the platforms.

Goods siding 
The goods siding was located north of the station platforms. There was a single loading platform located near to the A940.

Station location 
The station was located in sparsely populated farmland.

Closure 
Dunphail lost its goods service on 2 November 1964. The passenger service continued until complete closure on 18 October 1965 with the end of passenger services between Aviemore & Forres.

Remains 
The long platforms remain at either side of the track bed.

The goods siding platform and buffer stop remains.  The buffer stop has recently been restored.

The station building, stationmaster's house still remain.

The overbridge and signal box have gone.

Bustitution 
No replacement bus services exist to Dunphail.   This area is not served by public transport since the railway closed.

Sources 
 http://www.braemoray.com/edinkillie.htm - scroll down for some good images of the station during the days of operation.

References

Railway stations in Great Britain opened in 1863
Railway stations in Great Britain closed in 1965
Former Highland Railway stations
Disused railway stations in Moray
Beeching closures in Scotland